Nădlac is a town in western Romania, Arad County. A former part of the town lies across the border with Hungary; this village is called Nagylak. An international border town, Nădlac is the main border crossing into western Romania from Hungary. It is also a centre of the Lutheran Slovak community in Romania. Situated in the western part of Arad County, 50 km from the county capital, at the western border of Romania, Nădlac
is the main entrance gate from Western Europe.

Nădlac was first mentioned in documents in 1313 when it was known as Noglog.

The town's name in Hungarian language means "big place". The Romanian and Slovak names derive from that.

Population 

According to the 2011 census, Nădlac had 7,185 inhabitants. The ethnic breakdown was as follows:
 Romanians: 47.26%
 Slovaks: 43.85%
 Romani: 5.1%
 Hungarians: 2.37%
 Others: 1.75%

History
Archaeological excavations have brought to the surface traces of existence of the Dacian-Romans.
Throughout times Nădlac, a castle with wooden and soil fortification, was invaded by the Tartars, was held by János Hunyadi, and was donated to the commanding officers Gyorgy Istvan and Dmitar Jakšić who laid the foundation of a new fortification. It was also ravaged several times by the Turks, and was razed to the ground by the rebels led by György Dózsa. It was, however, rebuilt every time. In 1685 the town was conquered by the Austrian royal army and was integrated in the border disposition of the Mureș valley.

One of the most important moments in the history of Nădlac took place in the early 19th century, when the colonization process of the Slovaks started. This nationality has contributed to a great extent to the development of the settlement.

Tourist attractions
Among the town's tourist sights are the Saint Nicholas Church and the Slovak Lutheran church. There is also a park called "Lunca Mureșului."

References

External links 

 Site in Slovak

Populated places in Arad County
Towns in Romania
Localities in Crișana
Slovak communities in Romania
Hungary–Romania border crossings
Divided cities
Place names of Hungarian origin in Romania